Roggentin is a municipality  in the Rostock district, in Mecklenburg-Vorpommern, Germany.

The letter processing center for the greater Rostock area is located in Roggentin.

References